Clouthier is a surname. Notable people with the surname include:

Adolfo Clouthier (1909-?), Mexican athlete
Brett Clouthier (born 1981), Canadian ice hockey player
Hec Clouthier (born 1949), Canadian politician
Manuel Clouthier (1934–1989), Mexican businessman and politician
Manuel Clouthier Carrillo (born 1961), Mexican politician
Tatiana Clouthier (born 1964), Mexican educator and politician